The Fantastic Plastic Machine is the soundtrack to the movie of the same name.  An album composed and conducted by jazz saxophonist and film scorer Harry Betts.  A surf rock album, it is
considered a departure from his usual style.

Out of print for decades, the album is considered a collectors' item.  The album also inspired Japanese recording artist Tomoyuki Tanaka to take the stage name Fantastic Plastic Machine.

Track listing
"Theme from 'The Fantastic Plastic Machine'"
"Night Flight"
"Green-O"
"Day Groovin'"
"Straight Ahead"
"Rock Slide"
"McTavish"
"Nat's Theme"
"Outta Sight"
"Green Grotto"
"Long Reef"

Harry Betts albums
1969 soundtrack albums
Epic Records soundtracks
Documentary film soundtracks